Call of Duty: Roads to Victory is a 2007 World War II first-person shooter for the PlayStation Portable and a portable spin-off of Call of Duty 3 for consoles. It was released on March 13, 2007, developed by Amaze Entertainment and published by Activision Publishing. It is the sixth portable installment of the franchise, first being on J2ME, the second on N-Gage, the third and fourth on J2ME, and the fifth on the Pocket PC.

Gameplay

Campaign
In campaign mode several missions are available, throughout World War II. There are 3 campaigns throughout the game: American, Canadian, and the British. The American missions are Operation Market Garden, Operation Avalanche, and Operation Detroit. The Canadian missions are the Battle of the Scheldt, Operation Infatuate, and Operation Blockbuster. The British missions are Operation Market Garden and Operation Varsity. Although there are 14 levels total, each take place during a certain mission from World War II.

Multiplayer
In multiplayer, up to 6 players may play wirelessly via ad hoc, in nine different maps. Game types are Deathmatch, Team Deathmatch, Capture the Flag, Hold the Flag, and King of the Hill.

Development
Roads to Victory is the first and only game in the Call of Duty franchise made for the PlayStation Portable. The Nintendo DS has since succeeded the PSP in serving as the computing platform for newer related Call of Duty games, until the release of Call of Duty: Black Ops: Declassified which was released for the PlayStation Vita. A free voucher code for the game was included with purchase of Call of Duty: Black Ops: Declassified, allowing the game to be played on the PlayStation Vita.

Reception

Roads To Victory received mixed reviews. IGN rated it 6.6 out of 10 and GameSpot scored it 6.2 out of 10. GameSpy noted that the artificial intelligence in the game was "unimpressive" and "laughable", noting that despite the game initially having a "great presentation" that it was only "mediocre", scoring it 2.5 out of 5.

Roads to Victory has been criticized for some glitches. The Age commented that these glitches "tend to mar the experience at times, such as all the architecture vanishing in a blur or suddenly finding yourself stuck on the corner of an object for no obvious reason". The game's control scheme has also been criticized, with the Courier Mail stating that "the big drawback of the game is the clumsy control scheme, which has the buttons doing the work of the arrows and vice versa."

References

Bibliography 

 

2007 video games
Activision games
Roads to Victory
Multiplayer and single-player video games
PlayStation Portable games
PlayStation Portable-only games
Video games set in France
Video games set in Germany
Video games set in Italy
Video games set in the Netherlands
World War II first-person shooters
Video games developed in the United States
Amaze Entertainment games